Handszar Odeev (born 27 January 1972) is a Turkmen chess grandmaster (2004).

He played a record seven times in the Soviet Union Junior Chess Championships: in 1984, 1985, 1986, 1987, 1988, 1989 and 1990. Played for Turkmenistan in the Chess Olympiads of 1994, 1996, 1998, 2000, 2002, 2006 and 2010 and in the Asian Team Chess Championship of 2003. In October 1999, he tied for 2nd–10th with Eduardas Rozentalis, Ian Rogers, Vereslav Eingorn, Giorgi Giorgadze, Vlastimil Jansa, Christian Bauer, Konstantin Lerner and Alexander Shabalov in the 5th Wichern-Open tournament in Hamburg, with 30 grandmasters participating.

In the March 2011 FIDE list, he has an Elo rating of 2405, making him Turkmenistan's number six.

References

External links

Chessmetrics Player Profile: Handszar Odeev

1972 births
Living people
Chess grandmasters
Chess Olympiad competitors
Turkmenistan chess players
Soviet chess players
Chess players at the 2010 Asian Games
Asian Games competitors for Turkmenistan